Ugly, Dirty and Bad (Brutti, sporchi e cattivi) is an Italian grotesque film directed by Ettore Scola and released in 1976.

Ettore Scola won the Prix de la Mise en scène at the 1976 Cannes Film Festival.

Plot
The film tells the grotesque story of a large Apulian family living in an extremely poor shantytown of the periphery of Rome. The protagonist is one-eyed patriarch Giacinto (Manfredi). Four generations of his sons and relatives are cramped together in his shack, managing to get by mainly on thieving and whoring, among other things more or less respectable.

For the loss of his eye, an insurance company has paid Giacinto a large sum. Giacinto refuses to share his money with anyone, and spends little of it on himself, preferring to hide it from his family, which he routinely abuses verbally and physically. Various members of the family unsuccessfully try to steal his money. When Giacinto falls in love with an obese prostitute, brings her home and starts spending his money on her, Giacinto's enraged wife conspires with the rest of the family to poison him. However, Giacinto survives. In a frenzy of anger, he sets fire to his home. To his disappointment, his family survives.

Giacinto then sells the house to a Neapolitan immigrant family. Giacinto's family refuses to let the Neapolitans take over the shack, and in the ensuing fight, the shack collapses. The film ends with Giacinto living in a newly built exceedingly crowded shack with both his mistress and his wife, together with an apparently reconciled family and the newcomers as well.

Cast
 Nino Manfredi - Giacinto Mazzatella
 Maria Luisa Santella - Iside
 Francesco Anniballi - Domizio
 Maria Bosco - Gaetana
 Giselda Castrini - Lisetta
 Alfredo D'Ippolito - Plinio
 Giancarlo Fanelli - Paride
 Marina Fasoli - Maria Libera
 Ettore Garofolo - Camillo
 Marco Marsili - Vittoriano
 Franco Merli - Fernando
 Linda Moretti - Matilde
 Luciano Pagliuca - Romolo
 Giuseppe Paravati - Tato
 Silvana Priori - Paride's Wife
 Beryl Cunningham - Baraccata Negra

References

External links

1976 films
1976 comedy films
Italian comedy films
Italian satirical films
Films directed by Ettore Scola
Commedia all'italiana
Films set in Rome
Films shot in Rome
Social realism in film
Films about dysfunctional families
Films produced by Carlo Ponti
Films with screenplays by Ruggero Maccari
Films scored by Armando Trovajoli
Films with screenplays by Ettore Scola
1970s Italian films